Isiah Pinkney, known under the stage name 12 Gauge, is an American rapper.

He started out as a DJ, moving to rapping in the early 1990s, releasing three full-length albums. He is best known for his only top 40 single "Dunkie Butt", which peaked at 28 on Billboard Hot 100 and earned a gold certification.

He is from Georgia.

Discography
12 Gauge (Scotti Bros., 1994) US Billboard 200 peak #141, US R&B peak #44
Let Me Ride Again (Scotti Bros., 1995)
Freaky One (Roadrunner Records, 1998)
Da Shotgun Kid (Catapult Records., 2009)

Single
"Dunkie Butt (Please Please Please)" - Billboard Hot 100 peak #28, Hot Rap Singles peak #3

References

African-American male rappers
Living people
Musicians from Augusta, Georgia
Rappers from Georgia (U.S. state)
Roadrunner Records artists
20th-century American rappers
21st-century American rappers
20th-century American male musicians
21st-century American male musicians
Year of birth missing (living people)
Scotti Brothers Records artists
20th-century African-American musicians
21st-century African-American musicians